is a Japanese master of Shotokan karate.
He has won the JKA's version of the world championships for kumite on 2 occasions. He has also won the JKA All-Japan championships for kumite on 2 occasions.
He is currently an instructor of the Japan Karate Association.

Biography

Tomio Imamura was born in Kagoshima Prefecture, Japan on 7 October 1958. He studied at Takushoku University. His karate training began during his 1st year of university.

Competition
Tomio Imamura has had considerable success in karate competition.

Major Tournament Success
36th JKA All Japan Karate Championship (1993) - 2nd Place Kumite
4th Shoto World Cup Karate Championship Tournament (Tokyo, 1992) - 1st Place Kumite
33rd JKA All Japan Karate Championship (1990) - 1st Place Kumite
32nd JKA All Japan Karate Championship (1989) - 2nd Place Kumite
31st JKA All Japan Karate Championship (1988) - 1st Place Kumite
2nd Shoto World Cup Karate Championship Tournament - 1st Place Kumite
30th JKA All Japan Karate Championship (1987) - 3rd Place Kumite
29th JKA All Japan Karate Championship (1986) - 2nd Place Kumite
26th JKA All Japan Karate Championship (1983) - 2nd Place Kumite

References

 

1958 births
Japanese male karateka
Karate coaches
Shotokan practitioners
Sportspeople from Kagoshima Prefecture
Takushoku University alumni
Living people